This is a list of heads of state of Cambodia from the accession of King Norodom on 19 October 1860 to the present day. It lists various heads of state which served in the modern history of Cambodia, under several different regimes and with several different titles.

From 1860 onward, there have been 12 heads of state (acting heads of state are not counted).

The current head of state of Cambodia is King Norodom Sihamoni, since his election by the Royal Council of the Throne on 14 October 2004.

Titles
 1860–1960: King of Cambodia (under French protectorate in 1863–1945 and 1945–1953, and Japanese puppet state in 1945)
 1960: Chairman of the Regency Council
 1960–1970: Chief of State of Cambodia
 1970–1975: President of the Khmer Republic
 1975: Chairman the Supreme Committee
 1975–1976: President of the State Presidium
 1976–1979: Chairman of the State Presidium
 1979–1981: Chairman of the People's Revolutionary Council
 1981–1993: President of the Council of State
 1993: Head of State of the State of Cambodia
 1993–present: King of Cambodia

Key
Political parties

Other factions

Heads of state

Note: Dates in italics indicate de facto continuation of reign/office.

Monarchy

Republic

Restored monarchy

Timeline

See also
 Monarchy of Cambodia
 Prime Minister of Cambodia
 List of prime ministers of Cambodia
 Deputy Presidents of the State Presidium of Kampuchea
 Vice President of the State Council of Cambodia

Notes

References

Cambodia
 
Heads of state